Jiske Griffioen and Aniek van Koot defeated Sabine Ellerbrock and Yui Kamiji in the final, 6–3, 6–4 to win the women's doubles wheelchair tennis title at the 2013 US Open. With the win, they completed the Grand Slam, and van Koot completed the career Grand Slam.

Esther Vergeer and Sharon Walraven were the two-time reigning champions from when the event was last held in 2011, not being held in 2012 due to a scheduling conflict with the 2012 Summer Paralympics. However, Vergeer retired from professional wheelchair tennis in February 2013, and Walraven did not participate.

Seeds
 Jiske Griffioen /  Aniek Van Koot (champions)
 Sabine Ellerbrock /  Yui Kamiji (final)

Doubles

Finals

External links
Main Draw

Wheelchair Women's Doubles
U.S. Open, 2013 Women's Doubles